Trucks and Tractor Power was a weekly television show on TNN featuring mud bogging, tractor pulling and monster trucks.  The show's original hosts were Stan Rhoads and former Bigfoot driver Rich Hooser, along with pit reporter Mike Goss. Gary Lee replaced Stan Rhoads.  Army Armstrong later joined as a pit reporter, and later, when Hooser left the show, became color commentator.  The show initially began in 1989 as a vehicle for TNT Motorsports events, complementing their ESPN show Powertrax and syndicated show Tuff Trax, and would typically alternate between truck and tractor pulls and monster trucks, with National Mud Racing Organization mud races intermittently. After TNT was bought out by the United States Hot Rod Association in 1991, the show began primarily airing the Pendaliner Monster Truck Series and NMRO mud races held at Special Events' 4-Wheel and Off-Road Jamborees. A frequent feature of these shows was a highlight segment of "Tough Truck" amateur off-road races near the end of the monster truck episodes. The final season of Trucks and Tractor Power had Gary Lee as the host at the Monster Truck Thunder Drags, with Dave Rief, and later Tom Rivers, for the Jamborees. At the end of the 1996 season, the Pendaliner cancelled their sponsorship of the monster truck series, causing the show to be subsequently cancelled.

Monster truck television shows